Papi fut or Papi futbol is a popular Central American variety of football played on specially constructed outdoor courts also usable for regulation basketball. It is similar to FIFA football, but goals must be scored from within the goal area. There is also frequently a rule that a ball over head height counts as out-of-bounds.
This game can also be played at indoor facilities and inclusively in artificial grass courts, very common in countries like Costa Rica, where it is commonly referred to as Futbol 5 ("5" as a reference to the number of players per team that the game consists of).

Ball_games